Crocus kotschyanus, Kotschy's crocus, is a species of flowering plant in the genus Crocus of the family Iridaceae, found from Turkey to Caucasus and Lebanon.

It has gained the Royal Horticultural Society's Award of Garden Merit.

References

kotschyanus
Plants described in 1853